Don't Turn Your Back on Me may refer to:

Don't Turn Your Back on Me, an album by Jackie DeShannon, 1964
"Don't Turn Your Back on Me", a song by Jackie DeShannon, 1964
"Don't Turn Your Back on Me", a song by Brother Cane from Brother Cane, 1993
 "Don't Turn Your Back On Me", a single by Darryl D'Bonneau, 1996
"Don't You Turn Your Back on Me", a single by Guano Apes 1999
"Don't Turn Your Back on Me", a song by Hall & Oates from Our Kind of Soul, 2004

See also
"Don't Turn Your Back", a song by Tages, 1965
"Turn Your Back", a song by Billy Talent, 2008